Eocardia is an extinct genus of rodent from the Early to Middle Miocene of Argentina (Santa Cruz Formation) and Chile, South America.

References 

Hystricognath rodents
Prehistoric rodent genera
Miocene rodents
Miocene first appearances
Miocene genus extinctions
Miocene mammals of South America
Santacrucian
Neogene Argentina
Fossils of Argentina
Neogene Chile
Fossils of Chile
Fossil taxa described in 1887
Taxa named by Florentino Ameghino